Ruwan Dilruk (born 25 December 1978) is a Sri Lankan former cricketer. He played in 70 first-class and 48 List A matches between 2001/02 and 2009/10. He made his Twenty20 debut on 17 August 2004, for Ragama Cricket Club in the 2004 SLC Twenty20 Tournament.

References

External links
 

1978 births
Living people
Sri Lankan cricketers
Ragama Cricket Club cricketers
Place of birth missing (living people)